Pro.File 1 Meat Beat Manifesto/Jack Dangers Remix Collection is a collection of remixes by Jack Dangers and his collaborative Meat Beat Manifesto.

Track listing
DHS: "House Of God (Jack Dangers Mix)" - 7:15
Remix by: Jack Dangers
Nine Inch Nails: "Closer (Deviation)" - 6:16
Remix by: Jack Dangers
David Bowie: "You've Been Around (Dangers Mix)" - 6:57
Remix by: Jack Dangers
Deepsky: "Stargazer (Tuff Mix)" - 6:24
Remix by: Meat Beat Manifesto
Atomic Babies: "Cetcha Da' Monkey (Sonolgy Instrumental Mix)" - 6:10
Remix by: Meat Beat Manifesto
The Shamen: "Hyperreal (Selector Mix)" - 3:48
Remix by: Meat Beat Manifesto
David Byrne: "Ava (Nu Wage Mix)" - 3:57
Remix by: Meat Beat Manifesto
Freddy Fresh: "Party Right (All Terrain Mountain Mix)" - 9:04
Remix by: Jack Dangers
Banco de Gaia: "How Much Reality Can You Take? (Mysterious Drum Mix)" - 6:52
Remix by: Jack Dangers
Papa Brittle: "Status Quo (Westminster Dub)" - 8:24
Remix by: Jack Dangers
Tino: "Liquid Dub (Jack Dangers Mix)" - 5:15
Remix by: Jack Dangers

References

Jack Dangers albums